Mikel Pradera Rodríguez (born March 6, 1975 in Mallabia, Basque Country) is a Spanish professional road bicycle racer.

Major results

1999
2nd Overall G.P. Portugal Telecom
2000
7th Overall Critérium du Dauphiné Libéré
10th Classique des Alpes
2001
10th GP Miguel Induráin
2004
10th Overall Vuelta a la Rioja
2008
8th Overall Clásica Internacional de Alcobendas

External links

Cyclists from the Basque Country (autonomous community)
1975 births
Living people
People from Durangaldea
Spanish male cyclists
Sportspeople from Biscay